Geert Van Bondt (born 18 November 1970, in Ninove) is a retired Belgian cyclist.

Palmarès

1992
3rd Internationale Wielertrofee Jong Maar Moedig
1993
4th stage Tour of Belgium amateurs
2nd Tour de Wallonie
1995
3rd Nokere Koerse
1996
2nd Belgian National Road Race Championships
1997
Tour de l'Eurometropole
1st stage 
3rd overall
1998
2nd Halle–Ingooigem
2000
1st Gent–Wevelgem
3rd stage Danmark Rundt
2nd Kuurne–Brussels–Kuurne
2nd E3 Harelbeke
2002
3rd stage Rheinland-Pfalz Rundfahrt
2nd Paris–Bourges
2004
2nd Flèche Hesbignonne

References 

1970 births
Living people
Belgian male cyclists
People from Ninove
Cyclists from East Flanders